The Seattle Philharmonic Orchestra, hosted in Benaroya Hall in Seattle, Washington, United States, is a member-controlled orchestra founded in 1944.

The orchestra performs a minimum of four subscription concerts per season, in addition to outreach concerts and collaborations with other artistic organizations. Under the current (2003–present) music director Adam Stern, the Philharmonic presents a broad spectrum of orchestral music, from standard repertoire to local, West Coast, U.S. and world premieres.

The orchestra was given a brief mention in the Nickelodeon sitcom, iCarly, about a teenage girl who lives in Seattle in a massive apartment building. It was mentioned by the doorman's stalker ex-girlfriend, who buys tickets for the two of them to see a concert together in an effort to get them back together.

References

External links
 Seattle Philharmonic Orchestra website

American orchestras
Music of Seattle
Musical groups established in 1944
Performing arts in Washington (state)
Musical groups from Seattle
1944 establishments in Washington (state)